Hadsund is a city in the eastern part of Jutland with a population of 4,973 (1 January 2022) (5,414 incl. Hadsund South). The city is located by the narrow strait  of Hadsund, along an inlet called Mariagerfjord. This is a part of Mariagerfjord Municipality in the North Denmark Region. Until 2007, Hadsund was the administrative seat of Hadsund Municipality.

The town of Hadsund is home to a number of companies, including DAVA Foods, Nilfisk and Bodylab. The western part of the greater Hadsund area is home to the oldest still existing windmill in northern Jutland, Havnø Mølle, which was built in 1842 and operated until approximately 1927.

Although the etymology and origins of the city name remain inconclusive, one interpretation holds that the city's name can be traced back to the 18th century as "Houses of the Sound", which was formerly the collective name for the first settlements along the main road. The town was granted elevated privileges as a trade hub on 1 December 1854 (which was then the city's official birthday), but never gained de facto market town-rights.

The town houses multiple educational institutions, including Tech College Mariagerfjord, VUC Hadsund, Hadsund School and Hadsund Produktionsskole in the area of vocational education. The city has a broad selection of supermarkets and specialty shops considering the city's modest population. The town also has the only covered shopping center in Himmerland: Hadsund Butikscenter.

Storegade has constituted the city's pedestrian zone since 1990. The street was part of the main highway between Hobro and Aalborg until the road was reformed in 1970.

Hadsund is also the birthplace of author Hans Kirk.

The town of Hadsund 

The town of Hadsund is situated south of the city of Aalborg, and north of the city of Randers.

History 

It was founded in 1854, when it received handelspladsprivilegier (commercial space priviliges). Prior to this it mostly comprised a ferry terminal with permission to hold markets on either side of the fjord. In 1861, a commercial port was instituted in Hadsund. In 1883, a rail link was established to Randers, and in 1900 another link was made to Aalborg. The city had two railway stations, Hadsund North Station and Hadsund South Station, which both closed with the railroad in 1969. As of 1 January 2020, the town had a population of 4,971.

In 1904 a railway bridge spanning Mariager Fjord was constructed, creating easier access to the hinterland south of the inlet. Today, the city's bridge over the fjord keeps the city notable. 

In 1920, the Old Maskinsnedkeri was built in the city.

Arms of Hadsund 

Hadsund's arms were granted to the town in 1937. The coat of arms shows mainly the 1904 bridge. The four waves symbolize villages that lay in the municipality: Skelund, Visborg, Vive, and Hadsund. The crescent shape symbolizes the new municipality, and the star represents longevity. The bridge was replaced in 1976, but its classic steel arches were never changed in the town logo.

Neighbourhoods and settlements 
 Søndergårde is located in the northern part of Hadsund. The district was until approx. 1970 a city for themselves, but grew with Hadsund since built an industrial zone and a residential area close to the city.
 Hadsund Syd, originally Sønder Hadsund, lies immediately south of Hadsund bridge (about 250 meters). The district has 500 inhabitants and was founded approximately. 1880th in Hadsund South is Hadsund South Station, Ferry Inn Hotel South. Hadsund Syd has a current population of 477 (1 January 2014).
 Hadsund Huse located in the northwest part of town, next to the Secondary Route 507th

Other settlements in Hadsund:

 Molhøj
 Haderup
 Glargårde

Geography

Climate 
Climate in this area has mild differences between highs and lows, and there is adequate rainfall year-round. The Köppen Climate Classification subtype for this climate is "Cfb" (Marine West Coast Climate/Oceanic climate).

Notable people 

 Jørgen Lykke (1515 in Hadsund – 1583) was a Danish nobleman, diplomat and politician
 Thora Pedersen (1875 in Øster Hurup near Hadsund – 1954) a teacher, school inspector and women's rights proponent 
 Hans Kirk (1898 in Hadsund – 1962) a Danish lawyer, journalist and celebrated author
 Michael Westergård Jensen (1916 – executed 1944) a merchant and member of the Danish resistance, brought up in Hadsund
 Svend Axelsson (born 1937 in Hadsund) a Danish modernist architect
 Jan Beyer Schmidt-Sørensen (born 1958) a Danish economist, grew up in Hadsund
 Jakob Axel Nielsen (born 1967) a lawyer and politician, member of the Folketing since 2005, brought up in Hadsund
 Inger Støjberg (born 1973) was the Minister for Immigration, Integration and Housing, 2015/2019, lives in Hadsund

Sport 
 Ebbe Sand (born 1972 in Hadsund) a former professional footballer, over 400 club caps and 66 for Denmark
 Peter Sand (born 1972 in Hadsund) a Danish former footballer, fitness coach for Randers FC
 Thomas Christiansen (born 1973 in Hadsund) a retired football striker, over 350 club caps
 Dorte Dalum Jensen (born 1978 in Hadsund) a football defender, plays for LSK Kvinner, won over 40 caps for Denmark's women
 Thor Kristensen (born 1980 in Hadsund) team gold medallist in Denmark's rowing team in the 2004 Summer Olympics
 Peter Rosenmeier (born 1984 in Hadsund) a Danish Paralympic table tennis player
 Niklas Laustsen (born 1992 in Hadsund) a Danish BMX rider

References

External links

 Mariagerfjord municipality's official website) 
 Hadsund Trade association
 Official website (dead link)

 
Cities and towns in the North Jutland Region
Mariagerfjord Municipality